Pasing is a district in the city of Munich, Germany, and part of the borough Pasing-Obermenzing.

Overview
Pasing is located west of the Munich city centre, at the north-western edge of the city's innermost traffic zone. The district is mainly residential; there is a large concentration of shops, hotels and restaurant at the Pasinger Marienplatz (Pasing St. Mary Square), the quarter's main square. The quarter's railway station, Pasing Station, is served by the S-Bahn suburban trains 3, 4, 6, 8 and 20 as well as national and international trains services. Tram line 19 and several local bus lines terminate at the station

The Pasinger Stadtpark (Pasing City Park) is the quarter's main recreational park. It is located south of Pasing Marienplatz, straddling the river Würm. Nearby, a branch of the Munich University of Applied Sciences is located.

Population 

On 31 December 1991, the population of Pasing was 39,723 residents over an area of 4.15 square miles (1,074 hectares). On 31 December 1999, there were 35,752 people; there has been no independent survey since 1999, due to being surveyed together with Obermenzing.

Economy 
Pasing is characterized by a balanced economic structure. The distribution of the 21,000 jobs in the manufacturing industry, trade, transport and other sectors of the economy is uniform. An emphasis on a commercial area does not exist. In addition to the wide variety in the village shopping center Pasing Arcaden exists.

Notable people
 Alois Wunder (1878–1974), only Oberbürgermeister of Pasing
 Hans Nimmerfall (1872–1934), politician
 Felix Neureuther (b. 1984), World Cup alpine ski racer
 Michael Ende (1929-1999) important author for children books.

See also 
 Pasing Arcaden
 Munich Pasing station
 August-Exter-Straße
 Pasinger Fabrik
 Nordumgehung Pasing